The John von Neumann Environmental Research Institute of the Pacific is a non profit environmental and anthropological research institute of executive branch of the government of Colombia ascribed to the Ministry of Environment and Sustainable Development and charged with conducting research and investigations on the Pacific littoral and the biodiversity of the Chocó biogeographic hotspot.

References 

Chocó Department
Ministry of Environment and Sustainable Development (Colombia)
Environmental research institutes
Research institutes in Colombia
Biological research institutes
Anthropological research institutes
Organizations established in 1993